The 2020–21 Thai FA Cup is the 27th season of a Thailand's knockout football competition, this season is the 50th anniversary since its establishment in 1970. The tournament was sponsored by Chang, and known as the Chang FA Cup for sponsorship purposes. The tournament is organized by the Football Association of Thailand. 91 clubs were accepted into the tournament, and it began with the qualification round on 30 September 2020 and concluded with the final on 11 April 2021. The winner would have qualified for the 2022 AFC Champions League group stage and the 2021 Thailand Champions Cup.

Calendar

Results
Note: T1: Clubs from Thai League 1; T2: Clubs from Thai League 2; T3: Clubs from Thai League 3; T4: Clubs from Thailand Amateur League.

Qualification round
There were 8 clubs from 2020–21 Thai League 2, 25 clubs from 2020–21 Thai League 3, and 21 clubs from Thailand Amateur League have signed to qualifying in 2020–21 Thai FA cup. This round had drawn on 24 February 2020.

First round
The first round would be featured by 27 clubs which were the winners of the qualification round including 4 clubs from T2, 17 clubs from T3, and 6 clubs from T4 and the new entries including 16 clubs from 2020–21 Thai League 1, 5 clubs from 2020–21 Thai League 2, 7 clubs from 2020–21 Thai League 3, and 9 clubs from Thailand Amateur League. This round had drawn on 22 October 2020.

Second round
The second round would be featured by 32 clubs which were the winners of the first round including 15 clubs from T1, 5 clubs from T2, 10 clubs from T3, and 2 clubs from T4. This round had drawn on 12 November 2020.

Third round
The third round would be featured by 16 clubs which were the winners of the second round including 10 clubs from T1, 2 clubs from T2, and 4 clubs from T3. This round had drawn on 15 December 2020.

Quarter-finals
The quarter-finals would be featured by 8 clubs which were the winners of the third round including 7 clubs from T1 and 1 club from T3. This round had drawn on 1 March 2021.

Semi-finals
The semi-finals would be featured by 4 clubs which were the winners of the quarter-finals, all were clubs from T1. This round had drawn on 5 April 2021.

Final

The final round would be featured by 2 clubs which were the winners of the semi-finals round, both were clubs from T1. This round was played on 11 April 2021 at Thammasat Stadium in Khlong Luang, Pathum Thani.

Tournament statistics

Top goalscorers

Hat-tricks

See also
 2020–21 Thai League 1
 2020–21 Thai League 2
 2020–21 Thai League 3
 2020–21 Thai League 3 Northern Region
 2020–21 Thai League 3 Northeastern Region
 2020–21 Thai League 3 Eastern Region
 2020–21 Thai League 3 Western Region
 2020–21 Thai League 3 Southern Region
 2020–21 Thai League 3 Bangkok Metropolitan Region
 2020–21 Thai League 3 National Championship
 2020 Thai League Cup
 2020 Thailand Champions Cup

References

External links
Official Facebook page

2020 in Thai football cups
Thailand FA Cup
Thailand FA Cup
Thai FA Cup seasons